A wood court are one of the types of tennis court on which the modern sport of tennis, originally known as "lawn tennis", is played. Wood courts are generally a form of hardwood flooring. Less common than other types, these courts were once commonly used used for indoor or covered court tennis tournaments, and occasionally they have been used to stage outdoor tournaments. They were largely supplanted by the development of indoor carpet courts on professional play.

History
In tennis history the surface was first introduced in competitive tournaments in 1878 at the Scottish Championships in Edinburgh, Scotland which was held on indoor wood courts until 1883. In 1881 in England at the Cheltenham Covered Court Championships and Gore Court Championships both indoor wood event. In 1885 the Seventh Regiment Championship was established and played on indoor wood courts at the Seventh Regiment Armory in New York City.

Wooden tennis courts were regarded as the fastest of all indoor courts, as they at had a very short and low bounce. In tennis play on wood courts the players speed is the tactical deciding advantage. Wooden surface courts were better suited to players with the most highly honed reflexes. Also there is more resiliency to wood tennis courts compared to concrete or cement courts; wood tennis courts also not as hard on the players feet, or the tennis ball itself.

Players
A wood court specialist is a tennis player who excels on wood courts, usually more than on any other surface, but not always. Pre-open era players played on multiple surfaces in their time including wood courts.

Male tennis players who were particularly successful on this surface (titles won in brackets); French player Jean Borotra (23), Australian players Ken Rosewall (20), and Rod Laver (18), American player Bill Tilden II (15), British players George Caridia (9), Laurence Doherty (8), Ernest Wool Lewis (7), New Zealander Anthony Wilding (7), Frenchman Andre Gobert (5), Czech player Jaroslav Drobny (4) and British player Bobby Wilson  (8)

Notable tournaments
 Bavarian International Covered Court Championships
 Berlin International Covered Courts
 British Covered Court Championships
 Canadian Covered Court Championships
 French Covered Court Championships
 German International Covered Court Championships
 London Covered Courts Championships
 Lyon Covered Court Championships (from 1948 called Coupe Georges Cozon)
 Queen's Club Covered Court Championships
 Seventh Regiment Championship
 Scottish Championships
 Scandinavian Indoor Championships
 Swedish International Covered Courts Championships
 Welsh Covered Court Championships
 World Covered Court Championships

References

Tennis court surfaces